Michèle Magema, born in Kinshasa in 1977, is a Congolese-French video, performance, and photography artist. She was born in Kinshasa, Democratic Republic of Congo in 1977. She emigrated to Paris, France in 1984, and currently resides in Nevers.

Biography

In 2002 Michèle Magema received her MA in fine arts from l’Ecole Nationale Supérieure d’Arts de Cergy. After her graduation, she travels to South Korea for a post diploma residency, followed by an Ifritry residency in Morocco. In addition to being a resident artist at the Cité internationale des arts in Paris, she has participated in the Africa Remix Exhibition. Her work has been exhibited in the Global Feminisms exhibition at the Brooklyn Museum, the Hirshoron Museum, and Sculpture Garden.

With a background in plastic art Michèle Magema started her career as a painter. Then she followed experimenting with video, performance, photography and finally mixing video with drawing and text. Nowadays she is a multimedia interdisciplinary artist expressing herself mainly through
video performance, where she overlaid different medias such as photography with drawing, drawing with video, photo on lace. The art of Michèle Magema has been influenced by many disciplines and artists: in literature and poetry by Baudelaire, Victor Hugo, Maya Angelou, Senghor, Edouard Glissant, Franz Fanon; in music by Billie Holiday; from the experimental cinema she has been inspired by Antonioni, Fellini, Rossilini, Wim Wenders, Ingmar Bergman, as well as from women artists like Pipilitorist, Cindy Sherman, Anna Mendieta, Eva Esse, Gina Pane, Renée Green.
Michèle Magema artworks are at the intermediary mental zone between individual histories, history and art history. She tries to establish a permanent dialogue between her own stories and souvenirs with the collective memory of the spectators by approaching different themes such as feminism, sociology, politics, and mythology. The presence or the absence of the body is always at the center of her work.

Michèle Magema earned several art awards and professional achievements among which the first prize of the Dakar Biennale 2004 and the Yango Biennale IFAA prize 2014. Some of her works are stored within private contemporary art collections including Sindika Dokolo Collection in Luanda (Angola), Tervuren Contemporary Collection (Belgium) and the Artothèque Villeurbanne (France).

One of her most well-known works is Oyé Oyé, (2004) a two‐channel video installation, in which a woman (Magema) is shown marching in place on the left, while on the right historic footage of Zaire's Mobutu Sese Seko overseeing parades of Congolese cultural pride.

References

Bibliography
 Africultures, Michèle Magema. http://www.africultures.com/php/?nav=personne&no=5261
 African digital art. The Video Artwork of Michèle Magema http://africandigitalart.com/2016/01/the-video-artwork-of-michele-magema/
 Signs journal (2005). Michèle Magema, Goodbye Rosa (2005). http://signsjournal.org/michele-magema-goodbye-rosa-2005-2005/
 Julie Crenn. Michele magema /// without echo, there is no meeting(2013). https://crennjulie.com/2013/01/11/michele-magema-without-echo-there-is-no-meeting-n-paradoxa-vol-31-2013/
 BrooklynMuseum (2010). Global Feminisms: Michele Magema. https://www.youtube.com/watch?v=O3QHF_1GVv0
 Muller, Dena (Winter 2008). "Reviewed Works: Global Feminisms by Maura Reilly, Linda Nochlin;
 Global Feminisms: New Directions in Contemporary Art by Maura Reilly, Linda Nochlin". Signs. 33 (2): 471–474. doi:10.1086/521560. JSTOR 10.1086/521560.
 Pensa, Iolanda (Ed.) 2017. Public Art in Africa. Art et transformations urbaines à Douala /// Art and Urban Transformations in Douala. Genève: Metis Presses.

Exhibitions

individual
2015 : Michèle Magema CCF - 4 th Lubumbashi Biennal - Lubumbashi/ DRC
2014 : Interstices - Galerie Saro Léon/ Las Palmas- Gran Canaria
2011 : Michèle Magema The Triptych - Jean-Marc Patras Galerie / Paris- France

Collective
Tramway Film Festival, Glasgow Slotland/United Kingdom
Opening Africa Museum, Permanent Collection Tervuren (vernissage, opening of the museum, Belgium)
Congo Stars, curated by Barbara Steiner- Kunsthaus Graz / Austria
I'm What I'm, curated by Julie Creen- IciGallery- Paris 11/ France
SUD (Salon Urbain de Douala), curated by Cécile Bourne- Farell-  Doual’art Art Space, Douala / Camerun

Nordwind Festival
YOUNG CONGO Nouvelle Génération d’Artistes Congolais- By Kin Arts Studio- Institut Français- Kinshasa/ DRC
AFIAC Des Artistes chez l’Habitant - FRONTIERES EFFRANGEES- FIAC/ FRANCE
SELLING THE SHODOWS to support the subsistence -  curated by Ingrid La Fleur and Ayana V Jackson- Cgallery – Milan/ Italy
AFRIQUES CAPITALES curated by Simon Njami, Gare Saint-Sauveur, Lille / France
LUCY’S EYE curated by Orlando Britto, CAAM- Las Palmas/ Gran Canaria
SUD (Salon Urbain de Douala), curated by Cécile Bourne- Farell-  Doual’art Art Space, Douala / Camerun
AN AGE FOR YOUR OWN MAKING curated by Bonaventure Soh Ndikung- Roskilde / Copenhagen/ Denmark
DAKAR  BIENNAL «  LA CITÉ DANS LE JOUR BLEU » curated by Simon Njami- Dakar / Senegal
4th LUBUMBASHI BIENNAL «  Réalités Filantes », curated by Toma Muteba- Museum of Lubumbashi-Lubumbashi / DRC
L’AFRIQUE A DU GENIE, curated by Ghitha Triki- 3 th International African Development Forum, Attijariwafa Bank Foundation, Casablanca/ Morocco
SENTIMENTAL FINAL ACT, curated by Elise Atangana  Revue Noire Gallery- Paris/ France
WHERE WE’ RE  AT : OTHERS VOICES AND GENDER -  Summer of Photography, curated by Christine Eyene,  Bozar Museum, Bruxelles/ Belgium
TOILES DE LUMIERES / collection Saro Leon, curated by Orlando Britto  Casa Africa  Las Palmas - Canary
Still Fighting Ignorance & Intellectual Perfidy Vidéo art from Africa curated by Kisito Assangni - Pori museum/ Finland
1st CASABLANCA BIENNAL – Casablanca/ Marocco
SUREEL CONGO  Kinshasa la ville des images/ Art Museum of  History and  Cultur – Dortmund- Germany
Still Fighting Ignorance & Intellectual Perfidy Vidéo art from Africa curated by Kisito Assangni :
 Contemporary Art Center /Moscou- Russia
 Art Museum Torrance– Californie- USA
Lucca Museum - Italy
Gallery Arena 1 – Los Angeles - USA
COLOGNE OFF - Cologne International Video Art Festival, September, Cologne Germany
UN CERTAIN CERCLE DE REGARD Cité Internationale des Arts Gallery, Paris/France
ARCO MADRID 2010 with Arte Invisible, Madrid, Spain
A COLLECTIVE DIARY AN AFRICAN CONTEMPORARY JOURNEY, Janvier-Avril 2010, Contemporary Art Museum of Herzliya, Herzliya ISRAEL
PANAFRICAN FESTIVAL, curated by Nadira Laggoune, Alger, Algeria
PARADE & PROCESSION here comes everybody, Parasol Unit, London UK
16 th INTERNATIONAL ART VIDEO FESTIVAL OF CASABLANCA, Casablanca Morocco
NOTES FROM THE EMPIRE, Kunsthaus Dresden, Dresde Germany
THE MESSENGER 10/10- 23/11, Cultur Center BRGGE - Bruge BELGIUM
THE CINEMA EFFECT (Illusion Reality and the Moving Image) 19/06- 07/09, Hirshhorn Museum and Sculpture Garden, Washington/ USA
DISTRITO LA REGENTA curated by Orlando Britto, La Regenta Las-Palmas/ Gran Canaria
ON PROCESSION, IMA Indiannapolis/ USA
FLOW,  Studio Art Museum in Harlem, New York/ USA
SUD (Urban Salon of Douala), Space Doual’art, Douala / CAMERUN
7th BAMAKO AFRICAN PHOTOGRAPHY BIENNALE  curated by Simon Njami, Bamako / Mali
BLACK PARIS, Iwalewa-Haus, Bayreuth / Germany
AFRICA REMIX, curated by Simon Njami 24/06/07 - 18/08/O7 :
 National Art Gallery, Johannesburg / South Africa
 Moderna Museet, Stockholm / Sweden
Mori Museum, Tokyo / Japan
Centre Georges Pompidou, Paris / France
Hayward Gallery, London / UK
Kunst Palast Museum, Dusseldörf / Germany
9th HAVANA BIENNALE, entitled « Urban Dynamic Culture », Havana / Cuba
AFRICATTITUDES 04/02- 19/03, Michèle Magema & Cheikh Niass, Maison du Livre, de l'Image et du Son, Villeurbanne / France
5th BAMAKO AFRICAN PHOTOGRAPHY BIENNALE / DIFFUSION PROJECT 27/04- 04/05, - Cultural Center of Teheran - Teheran / IRAN
BEAUTES AFRIQUES@NANTES, Le Lieu Unique, Nantes / France
LES AFRIQUES 31/03- 18/08, coproduction Tri Postale and Espace 251 Nord, Lille/ France
6th DAKAR BIENNALE, Dakar / SENEGAL - First Prize
5th BAMAKO AFRICAN PHOTOGRAPHY BIENNALE, Bamako / MALI

See also 
 List of public art in Douala

1977 births
Living people
Democratic Republic of the Congo artists
Democratic Republic of the Congo emigrants to France
French performance artists
French contemporary artists
People from Kinshasa
French video artists
Women video artists